BCCM may refer to:

 Basel Christian Church of Malaysia
 Belgian Co-ordinated Collections of Micro-organisms